The Mydaeinae are a subfamily of true flies, belonging to the family Muscidae.

Genera
Brontaea Kowarz, 1873
Graphomya Robineau-Desvoidy, 1830
Hebecnema Schnabl, 1889
Hemichlora Van der Wulp, 1896
Mydaea Robineau-Desvoidy, 1830
Myospila Rondani, 1856
Scenetes Malloch, 1936
Scutellomusca Townsend, 1931

References

Muscidae
Brachycera subfamilies
Taxa named by George Henry Verrall